Juan Fernández Mejías (born 1957), also known professionally simply as Juan Fernández, is a Spanish actor. While he has a decades-long career as stage actor, he is rather known to the public for supporting performances in film and television works.

Biography 
Born in 1957 in Seville.

He had his debut in a feature film with a performance as 'Juan' ("a burly truck driver") in Benito Zambrano's 1999 drama Solas, for which he earned the Actors Union Award for Best Film Performance in a Minor Role.

Later in his career Fernández performed a recurring role in Los hombres de Paco (Tomás aka "Castresana") in 2007, and starred in the TV series Tierra de lobos, aired on Telecinco from 2010 to 2014, playing the authoritarian landlord Antonio Lobo, the main antagonist throughout the series. He performed another antagonist role in the first two parts of the popular series Money Heist, playing Colonel Prieto, the CNI representative seeking to liberate Alison Parker from the Royal Mint. In 2017, he joined the cast of Amar es para siempre to play Rodrigo Tuñón, a veteran of the Spanish civil war for the Rebel faction.

Fernández landed supporting roles in two 2020 historical drama television series, Inés del alma mía and El Cid, playing in both cases the grandfather of the lead character (Inés Suárez and Ruy Díaz).

Filmography 

Television

References 

21st-century Spanish male actors
Spanish male television actors
Spanish male film actors
Spanish male stage actors
Living people
1957 births